The Party for the Liberation of the Burundian People, known as PAPIPE-Agakiza, is a small political party in Burundi led by Etienne Karatasi. It was created after a split from the Party for the Liberation of the Hutu People (PALIPEHUTU).

External links
Constitution of PALIPE-Agakiza at University of Texas

Political parties in Burundi